The Samuel S. Morton House is a property in Franklin, Tennessee that was listed on the National Register of Historic Places in 1988.  It has also been known as Lillie House.

The property's eligibility for NRHP listing was covered in a 1988 study of Williamson County historical resources.

See also
George W. Morton House, also NRHP-listed in Williamson County

References

Houses on the National Register of Historic Places in Tennessee
Houses in Franklin, Tennessee
Greek Revival houses in Tennessee
Houses completed in 1820
National Register of Historic Places in Williamson County, Tennessee